Mimusops balata is a species of flowering plant in the family Sapotaceae. It is native to Mauritius and Réunion.

References

balata